Iwami Station (石見駅) is a train station on Kintetsu Kashihara Line in Miyake, Nara, Japan.

Lines 
 Kintetsu Railway
 Kashihara Line

Platforms and tracks

History
 1923—Iwami Station was opened by the Osaka Electric Tramway as the Unebi Line was extended from Hirahata to Kashiharajingu-mae Station.
 1941—Owned by the Kansai Express Railway that merged with the Sangu Express Railway.
 1944—Owned by the Kintetsu Railway that merged with the Nankai Railway.
 Apr. 1, 2007—PiTaPa, a reusable contactless stored value smart card, has been available.

External links
 

Railway stations in Nara Prefecture
Railway stations in Japan opened in 1923